is a unisex Japanese name although it is more commonly used by males.

As a noun, Makoto means "sincerity" (誠) or "truth" (真, 眞).

People

Given name

Makoto (musician) (born 1977), drum and bass artist
Makoto (Sharan Q) (まこと), drummer of Sharan Q
Makoto (streamer) (まこと), Japanese streamer, voice actress
Makoto (wrestler) (born 1989), professional wrestler
, Japanese basketball player
, Japanese shogi player
, Japanese actor
, Japanese chemist
, Japanese writer
, Japanese voice actor
, Japanese writer
, Japanese academic
, landscape designer often credited with inventing the fortune cookie
, Japanese footballer
, Japanese basketball player
, Japanese Paralympic judoka
, professional baseball player
, professional golfer
, Japanese economist
Mako (actor) (岩松 誠, 1933–2006), Japanese-American actor and voice actor frequently credited as Mako
, Japanese sport wrestler
, Japanese musician
, Japanese ice hockey player
, Japanese pop singer, songwriter and multi-instrumentalist
 (1925–2012), Japanese physicist
, Japanese field hockey player
, Japanese footballer
Makoto Kobayashi (disambiguation), multiple people
, Japanese basketball player
, Japanese composer, son of Saburō Moroi
, artist famous for pictures of cats and dogs
, 2006 SASUKE winner
, former commissioner of the Japan Patent Office
, Japanese anime screenwriter
, manga artist
, former member of the idol group Morning Musume
, professional wrestler
Makoto Okazaki (disambiguation), multiple people
, J-pop idol and member of idol group Passpo
, Japanese poet and literary critic
, Japanese jazz pianist
, Japanese manga artist
, Japanese footballer
, Japanese naval officer and politician
Makoto Sakamoto (マコト・サカモト), drummer
Makoto Sakamoto (born 1947), retired Japanese-born American artistic gymnast and coach
Makoto Sasaki (disambiguation), multiple people
Makoto Satō (disambiguation), multiple people
, anime director
, Japanese sport shooter
, Japanese actress and voice actress
, former Japanese professional motorcycle racer 
, Japanese engineer
, Japanese diplomat and academic
, Japanese film and anime director, son of Osamu Tezuka
, Japanese shogi player
Makoto Tomioka (1897–1926), terrorist
, Japanese voice actress
Makoto Ueda (disambiguation)
, origami artist
, Japanese footballer and manager
, Japanese voice actor
, Japanese footballer
, Japanese manga artist

Family name
Naoya Makoto (born 1948), Japanese actor
Shiela Makoto (born 1990), Zimbabwean association football defender

Characters
Makoto, in Tales of the Otori
Makoto "Mako-chan" Ariga, in Wandering Son.
Makoto Takei, in Fruits Basket
Makoto Kibune, in Bleach (manga)
Mizoguchi Makoto, in Fighter's History
Makoto (Enchanted Arms), in Enchanted Arms
Makoto (Street Fighter), in the Street Fighter series
Makoto/Proto-Makoto: A robot girl (On MySims)
Makoto Aihara, in Rumble Roses and Rumble Roses XX
Makoto Aikawa, in Machine Robo Rescue
Makoto Amano, in W Juliet
Makoto Hanamiya, in Kuroko's Basketball
Makoto Hashimoto, in Battle Royale II: Blitz Royale
Makoto Hirano (Emmery), in HNMS Battle of the Schools and HNMS Battle of the Schools: A New Saga
Makoto Hozumi, in Sasami: Magical Girls Club
Makoto Hyuga, in Neon Genesis Evangelion
Makoto Isshiki, in RahXephon
Makoto Itō, in School Days
Makoto Jin, in Battle Fever J
Makoto Kashino, in Yumeiro Patissiere
Makoto Kawamura, character in Futari Ecchi
Makoto Kenzaki in DokiDoki! Pretty Cure
Makoto Kikuchi, in The Idolmaster
Makoto Kino (Lita Kino), in Sailor Moon
Makoto Kohsaka, in Genshiken
Makoto Konno, in The Girl Who Leapt Through Time
Makoto Kozuka, in Paranoia Agent
Makoto Kyogoku, in Detective Conan
Makoto Date, in Yakuza Kiwami
Makoto Makimura, in Yakuza 0 and Yakuza Kiwami 2
Makoto Mizuhara, in El-Hazard
Makoto Morishita, in Wangan Midnight
Makoto Naegi, a major character in the Danganronpa series
 Makoto Nakashima, a sister is Ai Nakashima in Haikyū!!
Makoto Nanaya in the BlazBlue series
Makoto Narita, in W Juliet
Makoto Niijima, in Persona 5
Makoto Ōgami, in Ghost Hound
Makoto Ohkawa, in Man of Many Faces and Tsubasa: Reservoir Chronicle
Makoto Onoda, in Futari Ecchi
Makoto Sako, in Shin Megami Tensei: Devil Survivor 2
Makoto Sakurai, a character from the anime and manga series Nichijou
Makoto Saotome, a character in Kannazuki no Miko.
Makoto Sawatari, in Kanon
Makoto Shido, in Idaten Jump
Makoto Shishio (志々雄真実), a villain in Rurouni Kenshin
Makoto Tachibana (橘 真琴), in Free! - Iwatobi Swim Club
Makoto Yutaka, a character in the manga The Day of Revolution and Princess Princess
Makoto Yuki, in Persona 3
Nijigahara Makoto in Aikatsu!
Yokomizo Makoto in AKB0048
Makoto Munechika in Kattobi Itto
Makoto, a character in the anime Digimon Tamers
Makoto Sugihara in Crows
Makoto Edamura (枝村真人), a character in the anime series Great Pretender.
Makoto Yuuki, a character in Ensemble Stars!.

See also
Motoko, a given name

Japanese unisex given names